Oh Ji-young (Hangul: 오지영, Hanja: 吳智永; born 11 July 1988) is a South Korean professional volleyball player. She was part of the silver medal-winning team at the 2010 Asian Games. She was part of the South Korea women's national volleyball team at the 2020 Summer Olympics. The team finished at fourth place in 2020.

In the summer of 2021 she moved to GS Caltex Seoul KIXX.

References

1988 births
Living people
South Korean women's volleyball players
Asian Games medalists in volleyball
Volleyball players at the 2010 Asian Games
Place of birth missing (living people)
Medalists at the 2010 Asian Games
Asian Games silver medalists for South Korea
Volleyball players at the 2020 Summer Olympics
Olympic volleyball players of South Korea
Sportspeople from Daegu
20th-century South Korean women
21st-century South Korean women